Hex is the debut studio album by English post-rock band Bark Psychosis. It was released on 14 February 1994 by Circa Records in the United Kingdom and on 11 March 1994 by Caroline Records in the United States. The term "post-rock" was coined by music journalist Simon Reynolds in his review of the album for Mojo magazine.

Reception

Reception to Hex was generally positive. Melody Maker described Hex as "the work of a band nourished by constant evolution and is unquestionably divine" and "a gorgeously intense 50 minutes".  The NME referred to the band as "nothing less than completely captivating" and called the album "a thoroughly marvelous record".

Track listing

Personnel
Bark Psychosis
Graham Sutton – vocals, samples and programming, guitar, piano, melodica, hammond
John Ling – bass, samples and programming, percussion
Mark Simnett – drums, percussion
Daniel Gish – keyboards, piano, hammond
Other Musicians
Neil Aldridge – triangle, programming
Pete Beresford – vibraphone
Phil Brown – flute
Del Crabtree – trumpet
Dave Ross – djembe
The Duke Quartet:
Louisa Fuller – violin
Rick Coster – violin
John Metcalfe – viola
Ivan McCready – cello

Technical personnel
Bark Psychosis – mixing, engineering
Roy Spong – mixing
Nick Wollage – engineering
Mog – engineering
Darren Westbrook – engineering
Pete Molyneux – assistance
Henry Binns – assistance
Lee Harris – assistance
Chris Blair – mastering

Charts

Notes

1994 debut albums
Bark Psychosis albums
Caroline Records albums